The 1977–78 international cricket season was from September 1977 to April 1978.

Season overview

December

India in Australia

England in Pakistan

February

England in New Zealand

Australia in the West Indies

References

International cricket competitions by season
1977 in cricket
1978 in cricket